Gorleston North railway station was a former station on the Norfolk and Suffolk Joint Railway connecting Great Yarmouth with Lowestoft. It was located on the northern outskirts of Gorleston-on-Sea, close to Great Yarmouth. Gorleston North was closed during the Second World War following bomb damage. Trains continued to pass through the station  until services were withdrawn from the line in 1970. The station was demolished after closure and the site is now occupied by the A47 road.

References

External links
 Webpage including old map with Gorleston North and Gorleston on Sea stations

Disused railway stations in Norfolk
Former Norfolk and Suffolk Joint Railway stations
Railway stations in Great Britain opened in 1903
Railway stations in Great Britain closed in 1942
Gorleston-on-Sea